Goring Lock is a lock and weir situated on the River Thames in England at the Goring Gap in the Chiltern Hills. The lock is located on the Oxfordshire bank at Goring-On-Thames, with Streatley, Berkshire on the opposite side of the river. It is just upstream of Goring and Streatley Bridge. The lock was first built in 1787 by the Thames Navigation Commissioners

The weir runs back to an island under the bridge and then another weir goes from there to the Streatley bank.

History

There was originally a weir and ferry here belonging to Goring Priory, which became the property of millers who kept a flash lock. A report in a newspaper of 1674 tells how 60 people drowned in the lock when the ferryman rowed too close to it. The pound lock was built in August 1787 from oak. Over several decades operation of the lock appears to have been shared with that of Cleeve Lock until 1869. Following this there were plans to build a lock-house, but this was not started until 1879.  The lock itself was replaced in 1886. In the last rebuild in 1921 the lock had intermediate gates installed, making two pounds, but these were removed in the refit in 2003.

Access to the lock

The lock is situated almost under the bridge and is easily accessible from both Goring and Streatley

Reach above the lock
The reach is only just over half a mile long. The Cleeve side of the river is occupied by large gardens stretching down the hillside with several boat-houses on the river. There are islands below Cleeve lock, with weirs between them, and these extend for some distance. On the Streatley side are meadows and woods.

The Thames Path, having crossed Goring Bridge to Streatley, continues through on the western bank to Cleeve Lock.

See also

 Locks on the River Thames

References

Locks of Oxfordshire
Locks of Berkshire
Locks on the River Thames
Weirs on the River Thames